Goulash is a Hungarian dish.

It may also refer to 

 American goulash, an American dish
 Goulash (bridge) is a style of playing the card game of bridge
 Goulash Communism, a form of communism that existed in Hungary
 Goulash (magazine)